Goslar is a railway station located in Goslar, Germany. The station opened on 23 March 1866 and is located on the Vienenburg–Goslar railway, Hildesheim–Goslar railway and Neuekrug-Hahausen–Goslar railway. The train services are operated by Erixx, Deutsche Bahn, and Abellio Rail Mitteldeutschland.

Train services
The following services currently call at the station:

Regional service  Hannover - Hildesheim - Goslar - Bad Harzburg
Regional services  Goslar - Halberstadt - Aschersleben - Könnern - Halle
Regional services  Goslar - Halberstadt - Aschersleben - Magdeburg
Regional service  Goslar - Halberstadt - Magdeburg - Potsdam - Berlin
Local services  Goslar - Vienenburg - Wolfenbüttel - Braunschweig
Local services  Göttingen - Kreiensen - Goslar - Bad Harzburg

References

External links
 

Railway stations in Lower Saxony
Railway stations in Germany opened in 1866